Montpelier is a historic plantation house located near Sperryville, Rappahannock County, Virginia. The main house was built about 1750, and is a two-story, 11 bay, stuccoed stone and brick dwelling with a side gable roof. It consists of a five-bay main block with north and south three bay wings. It features a two-story verandah stretching the entire length of the house with eight large provincial Tuscan order columns.  The property also includes the contributing smokehouse, storage house, and a frame cabin. It was added to the National Register of Historic Places in 1973.

From 2004 to 2009, Montpelier was owned by English conservative philosopher Sir Roger Scruton.

References

Houses on the National Register of Historic Places in Virginia
Plantation houses in Virginia
Houses completed in 1750
Houses in Rappahannock County, Virginia
National Register of Historic Places in Rappahannock County, Virginia